"Turn Down The Lights" is a song by Shanice. It was the second single released from her third album, 21... Ways to Grow. A music video was filmed. The remixes can be viewed on YouTube.

Track listing
"Turn Down The Lights" Remixes 

Promo CD Single and 12" Vinyl Single

1. "Turn Down The Lights" (Live Version Edit) [4:16]
2. "Turn Down The Lights" (Midnight Mix Edit) [3:55]
3. "Turn Down The Lights" (S.O.C. Remix w/o Rap Edit) [3:55]
4. "Turn Down The Lights" (S.O.C. Remix w/ Rap Edit) [3:55]
5. "Turn Down The Lights" (Focus LP Edit) [3:50]
6. "Turn Down The Lights" (LP Version) [4:31]

Weekly charts

References

1994 singles
Shanice songs
1994 songs
Motown singles
Song recordings produced by Babyface (musician)